The 1970 Cal Poly Mustangs football team represented California Polytechnic State College—now known as California Polytechnic State University, San Luis Obispo—as a member of the California Collegiate Athletic Association (CCAA) during the 1970 NCAA College Division football season. Led by third-year head coach Joe Harper, Cal Poly compiled an overall record of 8–2 with a mark of 3–0 in conference play, winning the CCAA title for the second consecutive season. The Mustangs played home games at Mustang Stadium in San Luis Obispo, California.

Schedule

References

Cal Poly
Cal Poly Mustangs football seasons
California Collegiate Athletic Association football champion seasons
Cal Poly Mustangs football